The Tolt Pipeline Trail is a  wide, unpaved equestrian, pedestrian and mountain bike trail in Seattle's Eastside suburbs.  It stretches   along the Tolt pipeline right-of-way from Bothell, Washington to the Snoqualmie Valley Regional Trail near Duvall.

References

See also 

 List of rail trails

Parks in King County, Washington
Transportation in King County, Washington
Hiking trails in Washington (state)